Bagherpara is an upazila of Jessore District in the Division of Khulna, Bangladesh.

Geography
It has a total area of 308.29 km2.

Demographics
According to the 2011 Bangladesh census, Bagherpara had a population of 216,897. Males constituted 49.59% of the population and females 50.41%. Muslims formed 83.60% of the population, Hindus 16.28%, Christians 0.01% and others 0.11%. Bagherpara had a literacy rate of 52.79% for the population 7 years and above.

As of the 1991 Bangladesh census, Bagherpara has a population of 168,938. Males constituted 51.21% of the population, and females 48.79%; this Upazila's eighteen-up population was 84303. Bagherpara has an average literacy rate of 34.5% (7+ years), and the national average of 32.4% literate.

Administration
Bagherpara Upazila is divided into Bagherpara Municipality and nine union parishads: Bandabilla, Basuari, Darajhat, Dhalgram, Dohakula, Jaharpur, Jamdia, Narikelbaria, and Roypur. The union parishads are subdivided into 155 mauzas and 191 villages.

Bagherpara Municipality is subdivided into 9 wards and 12 mahallas.

Education
 Gaidghat High School
 Agra Secondary school
 Charavita Secondary School
 PHL Secondary High School
 Bagherpara Pilot High School
 Bagherpara Pilot Girls High School
 Bagherpara Degree College
 Bagherpara Mohilla College
 Raipur School & College
 Selumpur High school
 Karimpur High School
 Bagherpara siddikiya fazil madrasha
 Azempur islamia alim madrasa
 Narikelbariya degree  college
 Narikelbariya high school
 Inra high  school
 Dayarampur Siddikya Senior Madrasha.
 Borvagh high school.
 Vitaballah High School.
 C.S.A.High School.
 Japan Bangladesh Friendship Agricultural College.
 Jamdia High School.
 Jamdia Hafijia Dakhil Madrasha
 Khalshe Girls School.
 Dargahpur Fazil Degree Madrasha
 Andul Baria High School
 Bir Protik Ishaqe College, Dhalgr
 Karimpur Hafejia Dakhil Madrasa
 Vangura Ideal College
 Bagdanga primary school
 Sommillio Biddapit Bagdanga Bohumukhi Maddomik Biddaloy

See also
 Upazilas of Bangladesh
 Districts of Bangladesh
 Divisions of Bangladesh

References

Upazilas of Jessore District
Jashore District
Khulna Division